The Burning is Finnish power metal band Thunderstone's second album.

Track listing
All songs written by Nino Laurenne, except where noted.
"Until We Touch the Burning Sun"  – 5:55
"Break the Emotion"  – 4:42
"Mirror Never Lies"  – 3:44
"Tin Star Man" (Titus Hjelm) – 5:10
"Spire" (Laurenne, Kari Tornack) – 4:37
"Sea of Sorrow" – 5:03
"Side by Side"  – 4:22
"Drawn to the Flame" (Hjelm, Tornack) – 4:43
"Forth into the Black"  – 4:41
"Evil Within" (Laurenne, Tornack) – 6:01
"In Sanity" (Japanese Bonus Track) - 5:52
"Welcome Home" (Metallica Cover) (Japanese Bonus Track) - 5:08
"Heart Of Steel" (Manowar Cover) (Japanese Bonus Track) - 4:56
"Let The Demons Free" (Demo) (Japanese Bonus Track) - 4:07
"Voice In A Dream" (Demo) (Japanese Bonus Track) - 4:17
"Me, My Enemy" (Demo) (Japanese Bonus Track) - 3:30

Chart Finnish

Personnel
Pasi Rantanen - lead vocals
Nino Laurenne- guitar, backing vocal
Titus Hjelm - bass, backing vocal
Mirka "Leka" Rantanen - drums
Kari Tornack - keyboards

References

2004 albums
Power metal albums by Finnish artists
Thunderstone (band) albums